Minchinhampton Common is a  biological and geological Site of Special Scientific Interest in Gloucestershire, notified in 1972.

The site is owned and managed by the National Trust. The common is one of the largest grassland commons in the Cotswold area.  It is south of Rodborough Common SSSI.  Both commons are on Jurassic limestone and are a central plateau with steep sides.  They drop down to the Nailsworth valley on the west side and the Frome valley on the north side.  The site designation includes the outlying areas of Iron Mills and Littleworth Commons. Neu-Lindsey Nature Reserve adjoins the western edge of Minchinhampton Common.

Minchinhampton Common is of both geological and biological importance.  There are disused quarries near the centre which provide fossil evidence for research purposes.  It is unimproved, herb-rich grassland. There are five units of assessment

The limestone Longstone of Minchinhampton is supposedly the burial site of a Danish leader.

Geology
The quarries are one of the most important Bathonian (Middle Jurassic) research sites in the United Kingdom. The fossil Limestones provide examples of various marine species including bivalve and gastropod fauna including limpets and thick-shelled sea snails, coral, crustaceans and reptiles. The site provides opportunities for significant further research on the local rock strata of the Minchinhampton and Burleigh limestones, and the relationship to the Bathonian successions to the east and south.

Biology

Flora
The central plateau supports a short grassland sward (due to stock grazing) with longer vegetation on the steeper slopes. The grassland includes upright brome, tor-grass, sheep's fescue, quaking grass and crested dog's-tail. Flowering herbs include common rock-rose, harebell, chalk milkwort and field scabious.  The area has a significant population of orchids, including the bee orchid, fragrant orchid and frog orchid.

There are more neutral grasslands and herb species in areas of landslip on the margins of the site. There are wet areas which support marshy vegetation. There are also areas of scrub which is dominated by hawthorn, bramble and dog rose.  There is juniper on the site, and a limited amount of broad-leaved woodland on the margins.

Fauna
The site is known for its variety of invertebrates and butterflies recorded are chalkhill blue, small blue, marsh fritillary and Duke of Burgundy fritillary. Moth records include cistus forester and juniper carpet.

The rare greater horseshoe bat is recorded as hibernating in the disused stone mines on the Nailsworth side.

Usage
There is a golf club and course. The grass is used to graze cattle in the warmer months, this is administered by the "hayward". Because of the cattle roaming free, there is a speed limit of 40 mph in the area. Part of the common was used to house a US military field hospital during WW2.

References

SSSI Source
 Natural England SSSI information on the citation
 Natural England SSSI information on the Minchinhampton units

External links
 Natural England (SSSI information)
 National Trust
 Stroud Oral History Archive (filtered for Minch Common)

Sites of Special Scientific Interest in Gloucestershire
Sites of Special Scientific Interest notified in 1972
Cotswolds